SS Richard With was a steamship in the Hurtigruten passenger ship fleet in Norway. It was built in 1909. It was sunk by the British submarine HMS Tigris in 1941, which caused the death of 99 people.

1909 ships
Maritime incidents in September 1941
Passenger ships of Norway
Ships sunk by British submarines